The Altiplano–Puna volcanic complex, also known as APVC, is a complex of volcanic systems in the Puna of the Andes. It is located in the Altiplano area, a highland bounded by the Bolivian Cordillera Real in the east and by the main chain of the Andes, the Western Cordillera, in the west. It results from the subduction of the Nazca Plate beneath the South American Plate. Melts caused by subduction have generated the volcanoes of the Andean Volcanic Belt including the APVC. The volcanic province is located between 21° S–24° S latitude. The APVC spans the countries of Argentina, Bolivia and Chile.

In the Miocene–Pliocene (10-1 mya), calderas erupted felsic ignimbrites in four distinct pulses separated by periods of low levels of activity. At least three volcanic centres (Guacha caldera, La Pacana, Pastos Grandes, Vilama) had eruptions of a Volcanic Exposivity Index (VEI) of 8, as well as smaller scale eruptive centres. Activity waned after 2 mya, but present-day geothermal activity and volcanoes dated to the Holocene, as well as recent ground deformation at Uturunku volcano indicate still-extant present-day activity of the system.

Geography

The Andes mountain chain originated from the subduction of the Nazca Plate below the South American Plate and was accompanied by extensive volcanism. Between 14° S and 28° S lies one volcanic area with over fifty recently active systems, the Central Volcanic Zone (CVZ). The Toba volcanic system in Indonesia and Taupo in New Zealand are analogous to the province. Deformational belts limit it in the east. The Altiplano itself forms a block that has been geologically stable since the Eocene; below the Atacama area conversely recent extensional dynamics and a weakened crust exist. The basement of the northern Puna is of Ordovician to Eocene age.

Geology

The APVC is generated by the subduction of the Nazca Plate beneath the South American Plate at an angle of nearly 30°. Delamination of the crust has occurred beneath the northern Puna and southern Altiplano. Below  depth, seismic data indicate the presence of melts in a layer called the Altiplano–Puna low velocity zone or Altiplano Puna magma body. Regional variations of activity north and south of 24°S have been attributed to the southwards moving subduction of the Juan Fernández Ridge. This southwards migration results in a steepening of the subducting plate behind the ridge, causing decompression melting. Between 1:4 to 1:6 of the generated melts are erupted to the surface as ignimbrites.

Mafic rocks are associated with strike-slip faults and normal faults and are found in the southern Puna and Altiplano. The southern Puna has calc-alkaline andesites erupted after 7 mya, with the least evolved magmas being the 6.7 mya Cerro Morado and 8–7 m Rachaite complex flows. Basaltic over shoshonitic (both 25 and 21 m) to andesitic (post-Miocene) lavas are found in the southern Altiplano.

Ignimbrites deposited during eruptions of APVC volcanoes are formed by "boiling over" eruptions, where magma chambers containing viscous crystal-rich volatile-poor magmas partially empty in tranquil, non-explosive fashion. As a result, the deposits are massive and homogeneous and show few size segregation or fluidization features. Such eruptions have been argued to require external triggers to occur. There is a volume-dependent relationship between homogeneity of the eruption products and their volume; large volume ignimbrites have uniform mineralogical and compositional heterogeneity. Small volume ignimbrites often show gradation in composition. This pattern has been observed in other volcanic centres such as the Fish Canyon Tuff in the United States and the Toba ignimbrites in Indonesia.

Petrologically, ignimbrites are derived from dacitic–rhyodacitic magmas. Phenocrysts include biotite, Fe–Ti-oxides, plagioclase and quartz with minor apatite and titanite. Northern Puna ignimbrites also contain amphibole, and clinopyroxene and orthopyroxene occur in low-Si magmas, while higher Si magmas also contain sanidine. The ignimbrites are collectively referred to as San Bartolo and Silapeti Groups.

Since the Miocene, less silicic magmas containing olivine,  plagioclase and  clinopyroxene have been erupted by the APVC as well. These "mafic" magmas form various monogenetic volcanoes, inclusions in more silicic magmas and lava flows which sometimes occur in isolation and sometimes are linked to stratovolcanoes.

Eruptions are affected by the local conditions, resulting in high altitude eruption columns that are sorted by westerly stratospheric winds. Coarse deposits are deposited close to the vents, while fine ash is carried to the Chaco and eastern cordillera. Most calderas are associated with fault systems that may play a role in caldera formation.

Scientific investigation
The area's calderas are poorly understood and some may yet be undiscovered. Some calderas were subject to comprehensive research. Research in this area is physically and logistically difficult. Neodym, lead and boron isotope analysis has been used to determine the origin of eruption products.

The dry climate and high altitude of the Atacama Desert has protected the deposits of APVC volcanism from erosion, but limited erosion also reduces the exposure of buried layers and structures. Evidence of volcanic activity and cyclic variation has been obtained from remote fallout deposits as well.

Geologic history

The APVC area before the upper Miocene was largely formed from sedimentary layers of Ordovician to Miocene age and deformed during previous stages of Andean orogeny, with low volume volcanics. Activity until the late Miocene was effusive with andesite as the major product. After a volcanic pause related to flat slab subduction, starting from 27 mya volcanism increased suddenly.

Ignimbrites range in age from 25 mya to 1 mya. In the late Miocene, more evolved andesite magmas were erupted and the crustal components increased. In the late Tertiary until the Quaternary, a sudden decrease of mafic volcanism coupled with a sudden appearance of rhyodacitic and dacitic ignimbrites occurred. During this flare-up it erupted primarily dacites with subordinate amounts of rhyolites and andesites. This triggered the formation of evaporite basins containing halite, boron and sulfate and may have generated the nitrate deposits of the Atacama Desert. The sudden increase is explained by a sudden steepening of the subducting plate, similar to the Mid-Tertiary ignimbrite flare-up. In the northern Puna, ignimbrite activity began 10 mya, with large-scale activity occurring 5 to 3.8 Ma in the arc front and 8.4 to 6.4 Ma in the back arc. In the southern Puna, backarc activity set in 14–12 Ma and the largest eruptions occurred after 4 Ma. The start of ignimbritic activity is not contemporaneous in the entire APVC area; north of 21°S the Alto de Pica and Oxaya Formations formed 15–17 and 18–23 mya respectively, whereas south of 21°S large scale ignimbrite activity didn't begin until 10.6 mya.

Activity waned after 2 mya, and after 1 mya and during the Holocene, activity was mostly andesitic in nature with large ignimbrites absent.

The APVC is still active, with recent unrest and ground inflation detected by InSAR at Uturuncu volcano starting in 1996. Other active centres include the El Tatio and Sol de Mañana geothermal fields and the fields within Cerro Guacha and Pastos Grandes calderas. The latter also contains <10 ka rhyolitic flows and domes. The implications of recent lava domes for future activity in the APVC are controversial, but the presence of mafic components in recently erupted volcanic rocks may indicate that the magma system is being recharged.

Extent

The APVC is the largest ignimbrite province of the Neogene with a volume of at least , and the underlying magmatic body is considered to be the largest continental melt zone, forming a batholith. Alternatively, the body revealed by seismic studies is the remnant mush of the magma accumulation zone. La Pacana is the largest single complex in the APVC with dimensions , including the  caldera.

These rates are substantially higher than the average for the Central Volcanic Zone, .

Source of magmas

Modelling indicates a system where andesitic melts coming from the mantle rise through the crust and generate a zone of mafic volcanism. Increases in the melt flux and thus heat and volatile input causes partial melting of the crust, forming a layer containing melts reaching down to the Moho that inhibits the ascent of mafic magmas because of its higher buoyancy. Instead, melts generated in this zone eventually reach the surface, generating felsic volcanism. Some mafic magmas escape sideward after stalling in the melt containing zone; these generate more mafic volcanic systems at the edge of the felsic volcanism, such as Cerro Bitiche. The magmas are mixtures of crust derived and mafic mantle-derived melts with a consistent petrological and chemical signature. The melt generation process may involve several different layers in the crust.

Another model requires the intrusion of basaltic melts into an amphibole crust, resulting in the formation of hybrid magmas. Partial melting of the crust and of hydrous basalt generates andesitic–dacitic melts that escape upwards. This residual is denser than the mantle peridotite and can cause delamination of the lower crust containing the residual.

Between 18 and 12 mya the Puna-Altiplano region was subject to an episode of flat subduction of the Nazca Plate. A steepening of the subduction after 12 mya resulted in the influx of hot asthenosphere. Until that point, differentiation and crystallization of rising mafic magmas had mostly produced andesitic magmas. The change in plate movements and increased melt generation caused an overturn and anatexis of the melt generating zone, forming a density barrier for mafic melts which subsequently ponded below the melt generating zone. Dacitic melts escaped from this zone, forming diapirs and the magma chambers that generated APVC ignimbrite volcanism.

Magma generation in the APVC is periodical, with pulses recognized 10, 8, 6, and 4 mya. The first stage included the Artola, Granada, Lower Rio San Pedro and Mucar ignimbrites. The second pulse involved the Panizos, Sifon and Vilama ignimbrites and the third was the largest, with a number of ignimbrites. The fourth pulse was weaker than the preceding ones and involved the Patao and Talabre ignimbrites among others.

The magmas beneath the APVC are noticeably rich in water derived from the subduction of water-rich rocks. The total amount of water has been estimated to be  , comparable to large lakes on Earth.

Tomographic studies

Seismic tomography is a technique that uses seismic waves produced by earthquakes to gather information on the composition of the crust and mantle below a volcanic system. Different layers and structures in the Earth have different propagation speeds of seismic waves and attenuate them differently, resulting in different arrival times and strengths of waves travelling in a certain direction. From various measurements 3D models of the geological structures can be inferred. Results of such research indicate that a highly hydrated slab derived from the Nazca Plate – a major source of melts in a collisional volcanism system – underlies the Western Cordillera. Below the Altiplano, low-velocity zones indicate the presence of large amounts of partial melts that correlate with volcanic zones south of 21° S, whereas north of 21° S thicker lithospheric layers may prevent the formation of melts. Next to the Eastern Cordillera, low-velocity zones extend farther north to 18.5° S. A thermally weakened zone, evidenced by strong attenuation, in the crust is associated with the APVC. This indicates the presence of melts in the crust. Other seismological data indicate a partial delamination of the crust under the Puna, resulting in increased volcanic activity and terrain height.

Subsystems

 Aguas Calientes caldera
 Alto de los Colorados
 Cerro Bitiche
 Cerro Blanco caldera
 Cerro Chanka
 Cerro Chao
 Cerro Chascon
 Cerro Chillahuita
 Cerro Galán
 Cerro Morado
 Cerro Panizos
 Chipas caldera
 Coranzulí caldera
 Delmedio
 El Morro-Organullo
 Granada complex
 Guacha caldera
 Huayra Huasi volcanic complex
 Kapina caldera
 Laguna Amarga caldera
 La Torta
 La Pacana
 Lascar
 Negra Muerta volcanic complex
 Pairique volcanic complex
 Pastos Grandes
 Pocitos
 Purico Complex
 Quevar
 Rachaite complex
 Ramadas volcanic complex
 Rincon volcanic complex
 Tastil volcano
 El Tatio
 TulTul
 Uturuncu
 Vallecito caldera
 Vilama

Ignimbrites
 Abra Grande Ignimbrite, 6.8 mya.
 Acay Ignimbrite,  9.5–9.9 mya.
 Antofalla Ignimbrite, 11.4–9.6 mya.
 Arco Jara Ignimbrite,  11.3 mya.
 Artola/Mucar Ignimbrite,  9.4–10.6 mya.
 Atana Ignimbrite,  4.11 mya. 
 Blanco Ignimbrite, .
 Caspana Ignimbrite,  4.59–4.18 mya.
 Cerro Blanco Ignimbrite,  0.5–0.2 mya.
 Cerro Colorado, 9.5–9.8 mya.
 Cerro Lucho lavas,  10.6 mya.
 Cerro Panizos Ignimbrite,  6.7–6.8 mya.
 Chuhuilla Ignimbrite,  5.45 mya.
 Cienago Ignimbrite, 7.9 mya.
 Cueva Negra/Leon Muerto Ignimbrites,  3.8–4.25 mya.
 Cusi Cusi Ignimbrite, >10 mya.
 Galan Ignimbrite,  2.1 mya.
 Granada/Orosmayo/Pampa Barreno Ignimbrite,  10-10.5 mya.
 Grenada Ignimbrite, 9.8 mya.
 Guacha Ignimbrite,  5.6–5.7 mya.
 Guaitiquina Ignimbrite, 5.07 mya.
 Laguna Amarga Ignimbrite, 3.7–4.0, 5.0 mya.
 Laguna Colorada Ignimbrite,  1.98 mya.
 Laguna Verde Ignimbrite,  3.7–4.0 mya.
 Las Termas Ignimbrite 1 and 2,  6.45 mya.
 Los Colorados Ignimbrite, 7.5–7.9 mya.
 Merihuaca Ignimbrites,  5.49–6.39 mya.
 Morro I Ignimbrite, 12 mya.
 Morro II Ignimbrite, 6 mya.
 Pairique Chico block and ash,  10.4 mya.
 Pampa Chamaca,  2.52 mya.
 Pitas/Vega Real Grande Ignimbrites,  4.51–4.84 mya.
 Potrero Grande Ignimbrite, 9.8–9 mya.
 Potreros Ignimbrite, 6.6 mya.
 Purico Ignimbrite,  1.3 mya.
 Puripicar Ignimbrite,  4.2 mya.
 Rachaite volcanic complex, 7.2–8.4 mya.
 Rosada Ignimbrite,  6.3–8.1 mya.
 Sifon Ignimbrite, 8.3 mya.
 Tajamar/Chorrillos Ignimbrite,  10.5–10.1 mya.
 Tamberia Ignimbrite, 10.7–9.5 mya.
 Tara Ignimbrite,  3.6 mya.
 Tatio Ignimbrite,  0.703 mya.
 Toba 1 Ignimbrite,  7.6 mya.
 Toconao pumice,  4.65 mya. 
 Vallecito Ignimbrite,  3.6 mya.
 Verde Ignimbrite,  17.2 mya.
 Vilama Ignimbrite, 8.4–8.5 mya.
 Vizcayayoc Ignimbrite, 13 mya.

References

Bibliography

External links

 Volcano World
 Andes Ignimbrite Database

Volcanism of Chile
Andean Volcanic Belt
Plate tectonics
Miocene volcanism
Pliocene volcanism
Pleistocene volcanism
Geology of Bolivia
Geology of Chile
Geology of Argentina
Miocene South America
Neogene South America
Pleistocene South America
Quaternary South America
Miocene geology
Pleistocene geology
Pliocene geology
Geology of South America
Puna de Atacama